The 2009–10 season was ACF Fiorentina's 84th season in Italian football in their existence and their 72nd season in the first-tier of Italian football, Serie A. Having finished fourth the previous season ahead of Genoa, La Viola earned qualification into the UEFA Champions League for the second year in a row.

Club

Coaching staff

Players

Squad information

Transfers

In

Total spending:  €34.7 million + Manuel da Costa

Out

Total income:  ~€40 million

Competitions

Overall

Last updated: 16 May 2010

Serie A

League table

Results summary

Results by round

Matches

Coppa Italia

UEFA Champions League

Play-off round

Group stage

Knockout phase

Round of 16

Statistics

Appearances and goals

Goalscorers

Last updated: 16 May 2010

References

ACF Fiorentina seasons
Fiorentina